Cabarroguis, officially the Municipality of Cabarroguis, is a 3rd class municipality and capital of the province of Quirino, Philippines. According to the 2020 census, it has a population of 33,533 people.

History 

Prior to the advent of settlement, Cabarroguis was a vast forested area and formed parts of the municipalities of Saguday, Diffun and Aglipay. It was originally occupied by the Aetas who were later displaced by the Ilongot tribe because the Aetas were known to be of nomadic character. Many years later, permanent settlements were made by different civilized ethnic groups like Ilocanos, Tagalog and others in search of good fortune in this virgin land. As the population and settlement increased, regular barrios were created. These are the barrios of Zamora, Banuar, Burgos, Del Pilar, Dibibi, Eden, Villamor and five (5) more sitios of Villapeña, Villarose, Tucod, Calaocan and Dingasan at the municipality of Aglipay: barrios of San Marcos, Gundaway and portion of Mangandingay at the municipality of Diffun and the other part of Mangandingay at the municipality of Saguday. The above stated barrios of different municipalities became the territorial jurisdiction of Cabarroguis by virtue of Republic Act No. 5554 enacted by the Philippine Congress authored by then Honorable Senator Leonardo Perez on June 21, 1969. The newly created municipality of Cabarroguis was named in honor of the late Congressman of Nueva Vizcaya, Honorable Leon Cabarroguis.

Cabarroguis operated as a regular municipality after the 1971 local polls wherein Honorable Anastacio dela Pena become the first Local Chief Executive. Barangay Mangandingay also became the temporary seat of the municipal government, Years later, when Honorable Diomedes Dumayas was appointed as the town's executive, the seat of the Local Government officially transferred to Barangay Zamora where a 12 hectares lot was donated.

Geography 
Cabarroguis is located in the northwestern part of the province of Quirino. It is bounded on the north, northwest and northeast by the municipalities of Diffun and Saguday respectively, on the east and southeast by the municipality of Aglipay, on the south by the municipalities of Maddela and Nagtipunan, and on the west by the province of Nueva Vizcaya.

The municipal area of Cabarroguis covers 26,902 hectares approximately. The area is further distributed into the seventeen (17) barangays comprising the municipality including barangay Didipio which remains to be in the municipality and the province of Nueva Vizcaya and Quirino.

Barangays 
Cabarroguis is politically subdivided into 17 barangays. These barangays are headed by elected officials: Barangay Captain, Barangay Council, whose members are called Barangay Councilors. All are elected every three years.

Climate

Government
Cabarroguis, belonging to the lone congressional district of the province of Quirino, is governed by a mayor designated as its local chief executive and by a municipal council as its legislative body in accordance with the Local Government Code. The mayor, vice mayor, and the councilors are elected directly by the people through an election which is being held every three years.

Demographics

Initially, year 1970 recorded a population of 7,835 person followed by census year 1975 which registered a total population of 12,226 that manifested a growth rate of 9.29%. Another increase of population was observed during census year 1980 which recorded 17,450 displaying a growth rate of 2.2% and for census year 1995, it manifested a 22,812 person displaying a growth rate of 2.25%. Base year of 2000 recorded a total population of 25,832 which manifested a growth rate of 2.25%. As of census year 2007, the population increased to 28,024 which manifested a growth rate of 1.21%.

Economy

Government
Cabarroguis, belonging to the lone congressional district of the province of Quirino, is governed by a mayor designated as its local chief executive and by a municipal council as its legislative body in accordance with the Local Government Code. The mayor, vice mayor, and the councilors are elected directly by the people through an election which is being held every three years.

Elected officials

Education
The Schools Division of Quirino governs the town's public education system. The division office is a field office of the DepEd in Cagayan Valley region. The office governs the public and private elementary and public and private high schools throughout the municipality.

References

External links

Cabarroguis Profile at PhilAtlas.com
Cabarroguis.gov.ph
[ Philippine Standard Geographic Code]
Philippine Census Information
Local Governance Performance Management System

Municipalities of Quirino
Provincial capitals of the Philippines